Tildie Soames is a fictional character appearing in American comic books published by Marvel Comics. She first appeared in Astonishing X-Men Vol. 3 #1 and was created by Joss Whedon and John Cassaday.

Publication history
She first appeared in Astonishing X-Men Vol. 3 #1 and was created by Joss Whedon and John Cassaday.

Fictional character biography
Tildie's strong mutant abilities first manifested as she was asleep in her mother's bed. She was having a nightmare that came to life. She killed her mother who was sleeping beside her. Her father rushed in and was also killed. The police were called and came to her house to see what was happening. Officer Hoyt was killed in the same way as her parents. Tildie was apprehended and taken to Benetech Labs, where she was used as a guinea pig for the "Cure" by Dr. Kavita Rao. Tildie lost her abilities and stayed at the labs with Kavita.

One night, Ord of the Breakworld stole her and used her as a hostage when confronted by the X-Men and S.H.I.E.L.D. She was successfully taken by the X-Men and returned to Benetech.

Abilities
Her nightmares can manifest into gigantic real monsters. At the same time, Tildie is inside the monster when asleep. She can unleash intensely powerful blasts of red energy.

In other media
 Tildie Soames appears in Wolverine and the X-Men, voiced by Danielle Judovits. In the episode "Battle Lines", she is incarcerated by the Mutant Response Division (MRD) until Magneto sends Juggernaut to break her out and implant her with a device to make her lose control of her abilities. A gigantic monster manifests from Soames' nightmares, swats the Juggernaut away, and goes on a rampage. The X-Men intervene and fight the monster, during which Wolverine discovers Soames inside. Emma Frost infiltrates the girl's mind while Rogue absorbs Juggernaut and Shadowcat's abilities to get inside the monster and remove the device from Soames before absorbing the girl's abilities to stop the monster. Following the fight, Soames comes to live with the X-Men so she can gain better control of her abilities. In the episode "Backlash", Shadowcat helps keep Soames calm while the other X-Men are away on a mission and the MRD launch a raid of the X-Mansion. In the episode "Foresight, Part 3", Tildie joins the X-Men when they meet with Professor X.
 Tildie Soames appears in the Astonishing X-Men motion comic voiced by Michel Friedman.

References

External links
 Tildie Soames at Marvel Wiki

Characters created by Joss Whedon
Comics characters introduced in 2004
Fictional characters with dream manipulation abilities
Marvel Comics female characters
Marvel Comics mutants
Nightmares in fiction